Givi Shalvovich Kerashvili (born 1 October 1953) is a Russian professional football coach and a former player.

External links
 

1953 births
Sportspeople from Vladikavkaz
Living people
Soviet footballers
Association football midfielders
FC Spartak Vladikavkaz players
Russian football managers
FC Zhemchuzhina Sochi managers